Suman Bala (born 15 December 1981) is a member of the India women's national field hockey team. She hails from Shahabad Markanda, Haryana, and played with the team when it won the Gold at the Manchester 2002 Commonwealth Games.

References 
Biography
Commonwealth Games Biography

1981 births
Field hockey players from Haryana
People from Kurukshetra district
Indian female field hockey players
Field hockey players at the 2002 Commonwealth Games
Commonwealth Games gold medallists for India
Living people
Asian Games medalists in field hockey
Field hockey players at the 2002 Asian Games
Field hockey players at the 2006 Asian Games
Asian Games bronze medalists for India
Commonwealth Games medallists in field hockey
21st-century Indian women
21st-century Indian people
Medalists at the 2006 Asian Games
Medallists at the 2002 Commonwealth Games